HMS M30 was a Royal Navy M29-class monitor of the First World War.

The availability of ten 6 inch Mk XII guns from the Queen Elizabeth-class battleships in 1915 prompted the Admiralty to order five scaled down versions of the M15-class monitors, which had been designed to use 9.2 inch guns.  HMS M30 and her sisters were ordered from Harland & Wolff, Belfast in March 1915.  Launched on 23 June 1915, she was completed in July 1915.

Upon completion, HMS M30 was sent to the Mediterranean.  Whilst enforcing the Allied blockade in the Gulf of Smyrna, HMS M30 came under fire from the Austro-Hungarian howitzer battery 36 supporting the Turkish, and was sunk on 14 May 1916.

References 
 Dittmar, F. J. & Colledge, J. J., "British Warships 1914-1919", (Ian Allan, London, 1972), 
 Gray, Randal (ed), "Conway's All the World's Fighting Ships 1906–1921", (Conway Maritime Press, London, 1985), 

 

M29-class monitors
Ships built in Belfast
1915 ships
World War I monitors of the United Kingdom
Royal Navy ship names
Ships built by Harland and Wolff
Maritime incidents in 1916
World War I shipwrecks in the Mediterranean Sea